A tunic is a garment for the body, usually simple in style, reaching from the shoulders to a length somewhere between the hips and the knees. The name derives from the Latin tunica, the basic garment worn by both men and women in Ancient Rome, which in turn was based on earlier Greek garments that covered wearers' waists.

Ancient era

Celtic tunic
Tunics worn by the Celts were documented by the Greek historian Diodorus Siculus:

Germanic tunic

The various Celtic and Germanic peoples living in the colder Middle and Northern Europe wore long-sleeved tunics from as long back as pictorial evidence goes. Such tunics are often found depicted on the various Roman monuments depicting victories over these peoples, and show the tunic as a simple pull-over construction reaching to the mid-thighs or to the knees. Similar tunics were eventually taken up by the Romans, and continued to be used into the Byzantine period.

After the fall of the Western Roman Empire, the long-sleeved Celto-Germanic tunic continued to be worn. The construction was more elaborate than the earlier Graeco-Roman garment, with a tight-fitting neck with a split down the front for pulling it over the head, and gusset under the arms and inserted around the lower half to give a flaring skirt. Being used by both Vikings and Normans, the garment continued as a general male garment into the Middle Ages, still being used in Norway as late as the 17th century.

Greek tunic

Tunics were also worn in ancient Greece, whence the Roman version was adopted. Later Greek and Roman tunics were an evolution from the very similar chiton, chitoniskos, and exomis all of which can be considered versions of the garment. In ancient Greece, a person's tunic was decorated at the hemline to represent the city-state in which he lived. Tunics might be dyed with bright colors, like red, purple, or green.

There was also the sisura (σισύρα), which according to Pollux was a tunic with sleeves of skins. According to the Suda, it was a type of inexpensive cloak, like a one-shoulder tunic. The Dictionary of Greek and Roman Antiquities mentions that it seems to have been more of a cloak than a tunic, and was worn for warmth or used to sleep in. According to the same source, late authors may use the term to mean a piece of cloth.

Indian tunic 
Indus valley civilization figurines depict both women and men wearing a tunic-like garment. A terracotta model called Lady of the spiked throne depicts two standing turban-wearing men wearing what appears to be a conical gown marked by a dense series of thin vertical incisions that might suggest stiffened cloth. A similar gold disc in the al-Sabah Collection from the Kuwait National Museum appears to be from the Indus Valley civilization and depicts similar conical tunic-wearing men holding two bulls by their tails under a pipal tree shown in an Indus-like mirror symmetry. A mother goddess figurine from the 
National Museum new Delhi shows a female wearing a short tight tunic.

Worn in the Indian sub-continent, including India, Pakistan and Bangladesh, the tunic is usually referred to as kurta and is an emerging women's top style increasingly liked by many in the West. An Asian tunic is typically adorned with delicate embroidery, bead-work or intricate threadwork as well. Embroidery or thread work on such tunics usually combines threads of many different colors.

Roman tunic
The Roman tunica was adopted by the Roman citizens in the 3rd century BC. It was often worn by citizens and non-citizens alike; citizens, though, might wear it under the toga, especially at formal occasions. The length of the garment, the presence or lack of stripes, as well as their width and ornamentation, would indicate the wearer's status in Roman society. Roman senators, for example, used the Laticlavus, with broad purple stripes, and members of the equestrian class wore the Angusticlavia, with narrower stripes. Soldiers, slaves and manual workers generally had tunics to a little above the knee; those in more sedentary occupations to about the ankle (unless they were expecting to ride a horse, when a shorter one would be worn).

The tunic or chiton was worn as a shirt or gown by all genders among the ancient Romans. The body garment was loose-fitting for males, usually beginning at the neck and ending above the knee. A woman's garment could be either close fitting or loose, beginning at the neck and extending over a skirt or skirts.

Medieval tunic

The tunic continued to be the basic garment of the Byzantine Romans of both sexes throughout the medieval period. The upper classes wore other garments atop the basic tunic, such as the dalmatica, a heavier and shorter type of tunic, again, worn by both sexes, or the scaramangion, a riding-coat of Persian origin. Except for the military or riding dress, men and women of higher status wore tunics that came down to the ankles, or nearly so. Tunics were often dyed or richly embroidered, although the plainer ones could be used when layering different types.

Beyond the reduced empire, the tunic continued to be worn with varying sleeve and hem lengths throughout Europe during the Middle Ages. Often reaching the knees or ankles, it was usually worn over underclothes consisting of a shirt (usually hip-length or longer) and drawers (usually knee- or ankle-length pants related to braccae). It may be accompanied by hose. Wool and linen were common fabrics used, though the wealthy sometimes wore fancy silk tunics or a lesser fabric with silk trim.

Tunics worn during the Early Middle Ages often featured decorative embroidery or tablet-woven braids along the neck, hem and wrists. This was the case, for instance, with tunics worn by both rich and poor Anglo-Saxons before the Norman Conquest.

Modern tunic

Around 1830, small boys began to be dressed in sashed or belted tunics over trousers, a fashion which replaced the earlier skeleton suit.

During the Crimean War in the 1850s, it was realized that the waist length jackets which had been worn by British soldiers since Napoleonic times were unsuitable for fighting in winter conditions. A new longer jacket was introduced which reached down to the mid thigh and this was named the 'tunic' after the 'tunica' of the intrepid ancient Roman soldier. This type of jacket soon became standard for most armies.

In Western culture, its use continues primarily in a religious and uniform context. It is the primary garment worn by the clergy and members of religious orders. The religious tunic reaches to the feet and was the source of the clerical cassock, as well as, in its liturgical form, the alb, after the long tunic worn by Roman citizens. 'Tunic' is also the name often given to the high-collar uniform coat worn by military and police personnel. Light feminine garments, especially for sports or exercise, usually only coming down to mid-thigh, are also called tunics.

See also

Salwar kameez
Clothing in the ancient world
Clothing in ancient Rome
Early medieval European dress
Anglo-Saxon dress
1830s children's fashion
1840s children's fashion
1850s children's fashion
Dress
Thawb
Dashiki
Gymslip
Kurta
Holy Tunic

References

Bibliography
 "Dress and Adornment." The New Encyclopædia Britannica. 15th edition. Volume 17. 1994.

Further reading
 Payne, Blanche: History of Costume from the Ancient Egyptians to the Twentieth Century, Harper & Row, 1965. No ISBN for this edition; ASIN B0006BMNFS
 Radicke, Jan: Roman Women's Dress, De Gruyter, 2022.

Medieval European costume
Ancient Roman legionary equipment
Greek clothing
Tops (clothing)
Dresses